Freya Patel-Redfearn (born 12 November 2000) is an English international badminton player. She has represented England at the Commonwealth Games.

Biography
Patel-Redfearn won three medals at the 2016 English Youth Championships. She made her senior debut at the 2020 European Women's Team Badminton Championships group stage and in 2021 won two games at 2021 European Mixed Team Badminton Championships. She joined the BWF World tour in 2021. She reached the third round of the 2021 European Badminton Championships in Kyiv and the semi finals of the Welsh International.

In 2022, she was selected for the women's singles and the mixed team events at the 2022 Commonwealth Games in Birmingham.

References

2000 births
Living people
English female badminton players
Badminton players at the 2022 Commonwealth Games
Commonwealth Games competitors for England